"When I Think of You" is a song written by James Williams and performed by Leif Garrett. It reached #11 on the US adult contemporary chart and #78 on the Billboard Hot 100 in 1979.  The song was featured on his 1978 album, Feel the Need.

The song was produced by Michael Lloyd and arranged by John D'Andrea.

References

1978 songs
1979 singles
Leif Garrett songs
Scotti Brothers Records singles
Song recordings produced by Michael Lloyd
Pop ballads
1970s ballads